The 4th East Asian Games was an international multi-sport event for countries in East Asia which was held in Macau from October 29 to November 6, 2005.

Host city
At the 11th EAGA Council Meeting held in Guam in March 1996, Macau, then a Portuguese colony was awarded the right and honour to host the 4th East Asian Games.

Venues
 Estádio Campo Desportivo
 Macau Stadium - Opening ceremony, Athletics, Football
 Macau Hockey Centre - Hockey
 Macau Olympic Aquatic Centre - Aquatics (Diving, Swimming, Synchronised swimming)
 Macau Stadium Pavilion - Weightlifting
 Macau East Asian Games Dome 
 Theatre - Dance sport
 Arena - Closing ceremony, Gymnastics
 Macau University of Science and Technology
 Sports Field - Football
 Tap Seac Multisport Pavilion - Basketball
 Bowling Centre - Bowling
 Nam Van Lake Nautical Centre - Dragon boat, Rowing
 IPM Multi-sport Pavilion - Karate
 Macau International Shooting Range - Shooting
 Tennis Academy - Soft tennis, Tennis
 Macau Forum - Taekwondo, Wushu

Emblem

The official emblem is the swirling pattern image of five Olympic colours blue, black, red, yellow and green which represents the Five Elements - Metal, Wood, Water, Fire and Earth as well as Macau as a new era multi-cultural city that fuse the Western and Eastern culture in the East Asian region with strong global influence.

Mascot
The official mascot is "Pak Pak" the squirrel which comes from Guia Hill, a place in Macau which has a lot of fir trees and is the site of the oldest lighthouse on the China coast - the Guia Lighthouse. He is described as friendly, sporty and happy-go-lucky.

Motto
The official motto: "New East	New Era	Let's All Join The Games" represents the East Asians' powerful energy that generates the new era, new beginning and progress towards prosperity with the rest of the world.

Theme song
The official theme song is "We Will Shine" which represents the value and meaning of persistence, sacrifice and pain and the dreams of the athletes and the celebration of the games as part of life.

Sports
The 2005 East Asian Games featured events in 17 sports, which was a new high for the competition. 11 of them are Olympic sports.

Aquatics

Calendar

Medal table

Results

Basketball

See also
 2006 Lusophony Games
 2007 Asian Indoor Games

References

External links
Official website archived via Wayback Machine
Results from the swimming, diving and synchronized swimming competitions.

 
East Asian Games
East
2005 in Macau sport
International sports competitions hosted by Macau
Multi-sport events in China
Multi-sport events in Macau
East Asian Games